Yust may refer to:

People
 Ernest Yust (1927-1992), Soviet football player
 Walter Yust (1894–1960), American journalist and writer

Places
 Yakhak-Yust, Tajikistan

Other
 Yanbian University of Science and Technology